Kruisfontein is a suburb of Humansdorp in the Eastern Cape of South Africa with about 15,000 inhabitants.

References

 

Populated places in the Kouga Local Municipality